Samantha "Sam" Quayle (born 8 October 1995) is a footballer who plays as a winger for the Wales national team and Portsmouth.

On 26 July 2021, Quayle rejoined Portsmouth.

References

External links
 
 
 

1995 births
Living people
Yeovil Town L.F.C. players
Wales women's international footballers
Welsh women's footballers
Women's Super League players
Bristol Academy W.F.C. players
Coventry United W.F.C. players
Women's association football wingers
Lewes F.C. Women players
Portsmouth F.C. Women players